Rayan Al-Bloushi (born 27 February 2001) is a Saudi Arabian professional footballer who plays as a striker for Saudi Pro League side Al-Ettifaq.

Career
Al-Bloushi started his career at the youth team of Al-Ettifaq and represented the club at every level. On 11 October 2020, he signed his first professional contract with the club. He was first called up to the first-team during the 2020–21 season. He made his debut on 10 April 2021 in the league match against derby rivals Al-Qadsiah. On 30 August 2021, Al-Bloushi joined Al-Fayha on loan.

Career statistics

Club

Honours

Club
Al-Fayha
King Cup: 2021–22

International
Saudi Arabia U23
WAFF U-23 Championship: 2022

References

External links
 

Living people
2001 births
People from Dammam
Association football forwards
Saudi Arabian footballers
Saudi Arabia youth international footballers
Ettifaq FC players
Al-Fayha FC players
Saudi Professional League players